The Sugar Bowl Stakes is an American race for Thoroughbred horses run near Christmas at the Fair Grounds Race Course in New Orleans, Louisiana. Set at a distance of six furlongs on the dirt for two-year-olds, the Sugar Bowl currently offers a purse of $100,000.

Although it is an ungraded event, it is still considered a prep to the Kentucky Derby, albeit a minor one.

Past winners

 2017 - Land Battle (Jose Valdivia, Jr.)
 2016 - Proforma (Florent Geroux)
 2015 - Taylors Angiel (Roberto Morales)
 2014 - Cinco Charlie (Robby Albarado)
 2013 - Alabano
 2012 - Tour Guide
 2011 - Exfactor
 2010 - Archarcharch
 2009 - Cool Bullet
 2008 - Ask Joe (Miguel Mena)
 2007 - Sok Sok (Shaun Bridgmohan)
 2006 - Teuflesberg (Robby Albarado) (run on Christmas Eve)
 2005 - Catonight
 2004 - Storm Surge
 2003 - Wildcat Shoes
 2002 - Saintly Look
 2001 - Mapp Hill
 2000 - Wild Hits
 1999 - Littlexpectations
 1998 - Show Me The Stage (Filly)
 1997 - Hailley's Prince
 1996 - Gold Case
 1995 - Valid Expectations
 1994 - Timeless Honor
 1993 - NO RACE
 1992 - Tonkas Mean Streak
 1991 - Ecstatic Ride
 1990 - Big Courage
 1989 - Jamie Boy
 1988 - Nooo Problema
 1987 - Dee Dee Lance
 1986 - Stage Door Avie
 1985 - Dr. Bee Jay
 1984 - Exclusive Pond
 1983 - Triple Sec
 1982 - Explosive Wagon
 1981 - El Baba (multiple stakes winner, undefeated in 5 races at 2, and in his first 7 races.)
 1980 - Top Avenger (multiple stakes winner, holds fastest fractions ever run in the Kentucky Derby, 1981)
 1979 - Real Emperor
 1978 - Clever Trick
 1977 - Cabrini Green (defeated John Henry three times)
 1976 - Clever Tell
 1975 - Go East Young Man
 1974 - Rustic Ruler
 1973 - Crimson Ruler
 1972 - Rocket Pocket
 1971 - No Le Hace (Grade I stakes winner)
 1970 - Alhambra Gal (filly)
 1969 - Oplayboy
 1968 - Six Mark
 1967 - Ranch to Market
 1966 - Tom's Favor
 1965 - Imam
 1964 - Bay Phantom
 1963 - Grecian Princess (filly)
 1962 - Blaze Starr
 1961 - Fortunate Isle (filly)
 1960 - Market Road
 1959 - Road House 
 1958 - Namon
 1957 - Pemberton
 1956 - Shan Pac
 1955 - Reaping Right 
 1954 - Speed Rouser
 1953 - Fast Charger
 1951 - Gushing Oil
 1950 - Bugledrums

References

External links
 

Fair Grounds Race Course
Ungraded stakes races in the United States
Horse races in New Orleans
Horse racing
Recurring sporting events established in 1950
1950 establishments in Louisiana